No Time for Flowers is a 1952 romantic comedy film directed by Don Siegel, starring Viveca Lindfors and Paul Christian.

Plot
A young girl's loyalty to the Communist Party is tested in Prague when she falls in love with an attache who has just arrived from the United States.

Cast
 Viveca Lindfors as Anna Svoboda
 Paul Christian as Karl Marek
 Ludwig Stössel as Papa
 Adrienne Gessner as Mama
 Peter Preses as Emil Dadak
 Manfred Inger as Kudelka
 Peter Czejke as Stefan Svoboda
 Fred Berger as Anton Novotny
 Oskar Wegrostek as Johann Burian
 Helmut Janosch as Milo

References

External links

1952 films
1952 romantic comedy films
American black-and-white films
American romantic comedy films
Cold War films
Films critical of communism
Films directed by Don Siegel
Films scored by Herschel Burke Gilbert
Films set in Prague
Films shot in Vienna
RKO Pictures films
1950s English-language films
1950s American films